Labour Party leadership elections were held in the following countries in 2017:

2017 New Zealand Labour Party leadership election
2017 Scottish Labour Party leadership election